Hemiptilocera is a monotypic snout moth genus described by Émile Louis Ragonot in 1888. Its single species, H. chionographella, described by the same author, is known from Peru.

References

Phycitinae
Monotypic moth genera
Moths of South America
Taxa named by Émile Louis Ragonot
Pyralidae genera